Myennidini is a tribe of picture-winged flies in the family Ulidiidae.

Genera
Acatochaeta Enderlein, 1921
Arborotites Barraclough, 2000
Callopistromyia Hendel, 1907
Dyscrasis Aldrich, 1932
Myennis Robineau-Desvoidy, 1830
Namibotites Barraclough, 2000
Neodyscrasis Kameneva & Korneyev, 2006
Oedopa Loew, 1868
Paroedopa Coquillett, 1900
Pseudodyscrasis Hernández-Ortiz, 1988
Pseudotephritina Malloch, 1931
Pseudotephritis Johnson, 1902
Stictoedopa Brèthes, 1926
Stictomyia Bigot, 1885
Ulidiotites Steyskal, 1961

References

Ulidiidae
Brachycera tribes